George Keyes (September 17, 1919 – February 11, 2010) was an American professional golfer and two-time winner (1956 and 1967) of the Illinois PGA Championship.

Keyes served in the U.S. Army during World War II, seeing action in the Philippines.

Professional wins
1955 Arizona Open
1956 Illinois PGA Championship
1967 Illinois PGA Championship

References

External links
George Keyes (Golf Major Championships)

American male golfers
PGA Tour golfers
United States Army personnel of World War II
1919 births
2010 deaths